Chocomel (known as  Cécémel in Belgium) is a Dutch brand of chocolate-flavoured milk, produced by FrieslandCampina in Aalter, Belgium. The brand's trademark is owned by FrieslandCampina.

History
It was formerly produced by Nutricia in Zoetermeer and Riedel Drinks. Chocomel is widely available in the Netherlands, Germany, United Kingdom and Belgium (under the name of Cécémel). There are five varieties of Chocomel. Campina stopped producing a Mokka (mocha) flavor in 2011 and introduced the Vers varieties in 2015. Chocomel is also available in pod form for the Philips/Douwe Egberts Senseo coffee brewing system. The drink's slogan is "" (in Dutch), which means "The One And Only".

See also

List of chocolate beverages

References

External links

Official website

FrieslandCampina brands
Dutch brands
Chocolate drinks
Brand name dairy products